The Thirteenth Air Force (Air Forces Pacific) (13 AF) was a numbered air force of the United States Air Force Pacific Air Forces (PACAF). It was last headquartered at Hickam Air Force Base on the island of Oahu, Hawaii.  13 AF has never been stationed in the continental United States.  It was one of the oldest continuously active numbered air forces in the United States Air Force.

The command plans, commands and controls, delivers, and assesses air, space, and information operations in the Asia-Pacific region—excluding the Korea theater of operations—across the security spectrum from peacetime engagement to major combat operations.

Established on 14 December 1942 at Plaine Des Gaiacs Airfield, on New Caledonia, 13 AF was a United States Army Air Forces combat air force deployed to the Pacific Theater of World War II. It engaged in operations primarily in the South Pacific, attacking enemy forces in the Solomon Islands, Gilbert and Marshall Islands campaigns; Mariana and Palau Islands campaigns and the Philippines campaign (1944–45).

During the Cold War, 13 AF remained in the Philippines, providing air defense of the nation and becoming one of the Numbered Air Forces of Pacific Air Forces (PACAF). During the Korean War, its units provided staging areas for people and equipment destined for the war zone. As the Vietnam War escalated during the late 1960s and early 1970s, 13th AF provided command and control for USAF units stationed in Thailand, its units conducting combat missions throughout Indochina until August 1973. 13 AF units last engaged in combat during the SS Mayaguez Incident in May 1975.

Returning to the Philippines after the Vietnam War ended in 1975, the command remained there until the 1991 evacuation of Clark Air Base after the Mount Pinatubo eruption and the United States withdrawal of military forces afterward.

It was inactivated on 28 September 2012 and its functions merged with PACAF.

Overview
The command is charged with planning, executing, and assessing operations in support of the U.S. Pacific Command commander's objectives. On behalf of the Pacific Air Forces commander, the 13th AF commander is positioned to command Air Force forces, combined or joint force air components, or a joint task force. Thirteenth AF also commands the only Air Force-led standing joint task force, Joint Task Force Support Forces Antarctica, a collaborative Department of Defense and National Science Foundation effort supporting the U.S. Antarctic Program through Operation Deep Freeze.

Headquarters, 13 AF is made up of an A-staff (the Air Force Forces staff), personal staff, 613th Air and Space Operations Center (AOC), known as the Maj Richard Bong AOC, and the 613th Support Group. The 613th AOC is one of the U.S. Air Force's five full-capability AN/USQ-163 FALCONER weapon systems with the ability to plan, task, execute, monitor, and assess full-spectrum air, space, and information operations for the COMAFFOR and/or C/JFACC. The AOC serves as the nerve center of air operations during any campaign.

In June 1991, Mount Pinatubo buried Clark Air Base, Philippines, in volcanic ash, leading to the evacuation of military personnel and their families in Operation Fiery Vigil, eventually forcing the base to close 26 November 1991. Thirteenth AF relocated and officially established its headquarters at Andersen AFB, Guam, on 2 December 1991.

The command was moved from Guam to Hickam AFB in May 2005. In the early 2000s, 13 AF activated the 13th Air Expeditionary Group for a number of exercises, (February 2004-1 April 2004 for Exercise Balikatan 04; February–March 2004 for Exercise Cope Tiger 04; January–February 2005 for Exercise Cope Tiger 05.

Units 
Prior to its inactivation, two wings were permanently assigned to 13 AF:

 15th Wing, Hickam AFB HawaiiPartnered with the Hawaii Air National Guard, the 15th WG provides strategic, tactical and command airlift with C-17s, one specially configured C-40 and one C-37. It also includes a squadron of Lockheed F-22s. Finally it serves as an important en-route location for transient aircraft.
 36th Wing, Andersen AFB, GuamThe 36th WG has an expansive mission to support global projection and reach from its strategic location in the Pacific.

On 5 January 2007, Detachment 1, 13 AF was activated at Yokota AB, Japan. Det 1 is responsible for planning, coordinating, and executing air operations around Japan in coordination with the Japan Air Self Defense Force, through the Fifth Air Force staff at Yokota, and the 613th Air and Space Operations Center at Hickam.

The 613th Support Group maintains a consolidated commander's support staff providing personnel support for the entire headquarters; an operational support flight providing facility, training, readiness, and security management; and has two subordinate units: the 56th Air and Space Communications Squadron and the 17th Operational Weather Squadron.

The 13th Air Expeditionary Group, and formerly the 500th Air Expeditionary Group, is activated seasonally to support Operation Deep Freeze in the Antarctic.

History 
Thirteenth Air Force has never been stationed in the continental United States; it is also one of the oldest, continuously active, numbered air forces. It engaged in combat in the Pacific Theater during World War II. Since World War II, it has provided air defense in the Far East, primarily the Philippines, until the 1991 eruption of Mt. Pinatubo forced the closure of Clark AB. Numerous Thirteenth Air Force organizations participated in Southeast Asia combat operations in the 1960s and 1970s.

Lineage
 Established as Thirteenth Air Force on 14 December 1942
 Activated on 13 January 1943

Assignments
 U.S. Army Forces Far East, 14 December 1942
 Assigned to Far East Air Forces on 15 June 1944
 Assigned to Pacific Air Force (later, Pacific Air Force/FEAF [Rear]), on 17 May 1955
 Assigned to Pacific Air Forces, on 1 July 1957

Stations

 Plaine Des Gaiacs Airfield, New Caledonia, Melanesia (January 1943)
 Pekoa Airfield, Espiritu Santo, New Hebrides, (January 1943 – January 1944)
 Carney Airfield, Guadalcanal, Solomon Islands, (January – June 1944)
 Momote Airfield, Los Negros, Admiralty Islands, (June – September 1944)
 Hollandia, New Guinea (September 1944)
 Hollandia Airfield, Netherlands East Indies, (September – October 1944)
 Wama Airfield, Morotai, Netherlands East Indies, (October 1944 – March 1945)

 Clark AAFld, Luzon, Philippines, (March 1945 – January 1946)
 Fort William McKinley, Luzon, Philippines, 30 May 1946
 Clark Field, Luzon, Philippines, 15 August 1947
 Kadena AB, Okinawa, 1 December 1948
 Ching Chuan Kang Air Base, Taiwan, August 1958 – 25 April 1979
 Tainan Air Base, Taiwan, 27 January 1955 – 7 January 1976
 Clark AFB (Later Clark Air Base), Luzon, Philippines, 16 May 1949
 Andersen AFB, Guam, 2 December 1991– May 2005
 Hickam AFB, Hawaii, May 2005–28 Sep 2012

World War II

Commands 
During World War II, 13th AF consisted of two major commands, XIII Fighter Command and XIII Bomber Command.

XIII Fighter Command 
Activated on 13 January 1943. Served in combat with Thirteenth AF until the end of the war. Inactivated in the Philippines on 15 March 1946. Disbanded on 8 October 1948.

Groups
 18th Fighter Group (1943–47) (P-40F, P-39, P-38, P-61, P-70)(Transferred from Fifth Air Force, Hickam Field, Hawaii in March 1943).
 347th Fighter Group (1942–45) (P-39, P-38, P-40, P-400)(Established on New Caledonia on 3 October 1942)
 4th Reconnaissance Group (1943–45) (F-4 (P-38))
 403d Troop Carrier Group (1943–46) (C-46, C-47)
 Unattached Units:
 Det B 6th Night Fighter Squadron (February – September 1943) (P-70, P-38)Reassigned to 7th Air Force, 1943.
 419th Night Fighter Squadron (April – November 1943) (P-38, P-61)Activated April 1943 with P-38s, Reassigned to 18th Fighter Group, November 1943.  Reequipped with P-61s May 1944. Served in New Guinea, Philippines. Inactivated February 1947.
 550th Night Fighter Squadron (1944–46) (P-61)Activated June 1944. Received P-61s January 1945. Served in New Guinea, Philippines. Inactivated January 1946.
 7th Radio Squadron, Mobile (J)

XIII Bomber Command 

Activated on 13 January 1943. Served in combat with Thirteenth AF until the end of the war. Inactivated in the Philippines on 15 March 1946. Disbanded on 8 October 1948.

Groups
 5th Bombardment Group (1943–46) (B-17, B-24)(Deployed to Espiritu Santo in November 1942, reassigned from Seventh Air Force in January 1943).
 11th Bombardment Group (1943) (B-17, B-24)(Deployed to New Hebrides in July 1942, reassigned from Seventh Air Force in January 1943.  Reassigned back to Seventh Air Force, May 1943 and transferred to Hawaii)
 42d Bombardment Group (1943–45) (B-25, B-26)(Reassigned from Second Air Force antisubmarine patrol duty, March 1943)
 307th Bombardment Group (1943–45) (B-17, B-24)(Reassigned from Seventh Air Force, February 1943)
 868th Bombardment Squadron (Unattached) (1944–45) (B-24)Formerly 349th Bomb Squadron, 5th Bomb Group. The planes flown by the 868th were often called SB-24s and sometimes LABs (Low Altitude Bomber). They were equipped with SRC-717-B search and navigation radar. Formed into 868th Bomb Squadron in January 1944 and operated independently within the 13th AF.

Operational history

Thirteenth Air Force began operations in November 1942 as an organization composed of many widely separated Seventh Air Force and independent units scattered in the South Central Pacific during the Solomon Islands campaign.

Initially charged with taking a defensive stand against advancing enemy forces, Thirteenth Air Force later took the offensive flying a variety of aircraft, including the B-17 Flying Fortress, B-24 Liberator, B-25 Mitchell, B-26 Marauder, P-38 Lightning, P-39 Airacobra, P-40 Warhawk, P-61 Black Widow, C-46 Commando, C-47 Skytrain, and L-5 Sentinel.

It was Thirteenth Air Force P-38Gs of the 339th Fighter Squadron of the 347th Fighter Group which, on 18 April 1943, flew the mission which resulted in the death of Japanese Admiral Isoroku Yamamoto.

From 1942 to 1945, Thirteenth Air Force staged out of tropical jungles on more than 40 remote islands including the Gilbert and Marshall Islands campaign; Mariana and Palau Islands campaign and the Philippines campaign (1944–45), thus earning the nickname, "The Jungle Air Force." The command's units participated in a total of five different operation areas and 13 campaigns.

Thirteenth Air Force along with Fifth Air Force in Australia and Seventh Air Force in Hawaii were assigned to the newly created Far East Air Forces (FEAF) on 3 August 1944. FEAF was subordinate to the U.S. Army Forces Far East and served as the headquarters of Allied Air Forces Southwest Pacific Area. By 1945, three numbered air forces—5th, 7th and 13th—were supporting operations in the Pacific. FEAF was the functional equivalent in the Pacific of the United States Strategic Air Forces (USSTAF) in the European Theater of Operations.

After hostilities ended in 1945, Thirteenth Air Force established its headquarters at Clark Field, Philippines, in January 1946. In May of that year, it moved to Fort William McKinley, Luzon. By August 1947, 13AF returned to Clark Field. In December 1948, the unit moved to Kadena, Okinawa, where it remained for only a few months before returning to Clark in May 1949.

Korean War 
On 25 June 1950, 13AF consisted of the following units:

18th Fighter-Bomber Wing/Group (F-80)
21st Troop Carrier Squadron (C-54)
6204th Photo Mapping Flight (RB-17))

The 6204th Photo Mapping Flight, located at Clark AB, Philippines, deployed the Flight's two RB-17 aircraft complete with combat crews and maintenance personnel to Johnson AB, Japan in mid-June 1950. The FEAF deployment order specified that the two RB-17 aircraft be equipped with normal armament insofar as practicable, not to interfere with the photographic capability of the aircraft. This posed a problem for the Flight, since the RB-17s had been flying peacetime missions and were not equipped for combat. However, the 6204th found the necessary gunners and equipment, made the modifications to the aircraft, and by late August 1950 the detachment began flying photo-mapping missions over Korea. By the end of November 1950, it had photographed the entire North Korean area at least once and re-photographed some areas as far north as weather conditions permitted. By early December the detachment returned to Clark AB and resumed the flight's mapping program in the Philippine area.

During the Korean War, 13AF units provided staging areas for people and equipment destined for the war zone. During the decade of peace that followed the war, the command concentrated on training and surveillance activities to maintain a high state of readiness for contingencies.

Vietnam War 
From the time of signing of U.S./Taiwan defense arrangements, the 327th Air Division of 13th Air Force maintained units in Taiwan, up until 1979. 327th Air Division reported in this capacity to United States Taiwan Defense Command.

As the Vietnam War escalated during the late 1960s and early 1970s, 13AF again served as a staging base and logistics manager for units fighting in Southeast Asia. As more American aircraft and people were poured into the war effort, combat units and facilities under 13AF in Thailand increased. At its peak, 13AF was composed of seven combat wings, nine major bases, 11 smaller installations and more than 31,000 military members.

With the buildup and execution of Operations Desert Shield and Storm, 13AF provided aircraft and support staff vital to the Gulf war coalition victory in Southwest Asia.

Post Cold War 
In June 1991, Mount Pinatubo buried Clark in volcanic ash, forcing the base to close on 26 November and leading to the evacuation of assigned military members and their families in Operation Fiery Vigil. The Thirteenth Air Force relocated and officially established its headquarters at Andersen Air Force Base on 2 December 1991.

In 2005, the Jungle Air Force stood down as a traditional Numbered Air Force and moved to Hickam Air Force Base to assume the role of the new Kenney Warfighting Headquarters for PACAF, which was activated in provisional status in June 2005.

On 6 October 2006, after a one-year transformation of command and control of air, space and information operations in the Pacific, Thirteenth Air Force officially began operations as a component numbered air force headquarters and welcomed a new commander. Former Pacific Air Forces Deputy Commander, Lt. Gen. Loyd S. "Chip" Utterback, assumed command of the unit 6 October, replacing Maj. Gen. Edward A. Rice Jr., who had commanded Thirteenth Air Force from Andersen Air Force Base, Guam, and Hickam since January 2005. Previously designated as a management headquarters, Thirteenth Air Force became one of 10 organizations designed to enhance the operational level support, planning, command, control and execution of air, space and information operations capabilities across the full range of military operations throughout the U.S. Pacific Command's area of responsibility (minus the Korea theater of operations). In September 2012, 13 AF was inactivated and its functions merged into PACAF.

References
 
 Much of this text in of this article was taken from pages on the Pacific Air Forces website, which as a work of the U.S. Government is presumed to be a public domain resource.

Notes

Bibliography

 Lippincott, Lt. Col. Benjamin E. From Fiji Through the Philippines with the Thirteenth Air Force. San Angelo, Texas: Newsfoto Publishing Company, 1948.
 Maurer, Maurer. Air Force Combat Units of World War II. Maxwell AFB, Alabama: Office of Air Force History, 1983. .
 Mays, Terry M., Night Hawks & Black Widows, Schiffer Publishing, 2009. .
 Rohfleisch, Kramer J. Guadalcanal and the Origins of the Thirteenth Air Force (USAAF Historical Study No.35). Air Force Historical Research Agency, 1945.
 Rohfleisch, Kramer J. The Thirteenth Air Force, March–October 1943 (USAAF Historical Study No.120). Air Force Historical Research Agency, 1946.
 Rust, Kenn C. and Dana Bell. Thirteenth Air Force Story...in World War II. Temple City, California: Historical Aviation Album, 1981 (republished in 1992 by Sunshine House of Terre Haute, Indiana). .
 Smith, Stanly E. 13 Against the Sun. New York: Belmont Books, 1961.
 Wolf, William. 13th Fighter Command in World War II: Air Combat over Guadalcanal and the Solomons. Atglen, Pennsylvania: Schiffer Publishing, 2004. .

External links
 Thirteenth Air Force Factsheet
 Outside Link 7th Radio Squadron, Mobile (J) information.

13
Military units and formations established in 1942
Military units and formations in Hawaii
Military units and formations of the United States Air Force in the Vietnam War
13
World War II aerial operations and battles of the Pacific theatre